The 1973 National Football League draft was held January 30–31, 1973, at the Americana Hotel in New York City, New York. With the first overall pick of the draft, the Houston Oilers selected defensive end John Matuszak.

Player selections

Round one

Round two

Round three

Round four

Round five

Round six

Round seven

Round eight

Round nine

Round ten

Round eleven

Round twelve

Round thirteen

Round fourteen

Round fifteen

Round sixteen

Round seventeen

Hall of Famers
 John Hannah, guard from Alabama, taken 1st round 4th overall by New England Patriots
Inducted: Professional Football Hall of Fame class of 1991.
 Dan Fouts, quarterback from Oregon, taken 3rd round 64th overall by San Diego Chargers
Inducted: Professional Football Hall of Fame class of 1993.
 Joe DeLamielleure, guard from Michigan State, taken 1st round 26th overall by Buffalo Bills
Inducted: Professional Football Hall of Fame class of 2003.
 Ray Guy, punter from Southern Mississippi, taken 1st round 23rd overall by Oakland Raiders
Inducted: Professional Football Hall of Fame class of 2014.
 Drew Pearson, wide receiver from Tulsa, undrafted and signed by Dallas Cowboys
Inducted: Professional Football Hall of Fame Class of 2021.

Notable undrafted players

References

External links
 NFL.com – 1973 Draft
 databaseFootball.com – 1973 Draft
 Pro Football Hall of Fame

National Football League Draft
NFL Draft
Draft
NFL Draft
NFL Draft
American football in New York City
1970s in Manhattan
Sporting events in New York City
Sports in Manhattan